Japan-US (or Japan-US Cable Network – JUSCN or JUCN or J-US or JUS) is a submarine telecommunications cable system in the North Pacific Ocean linking the United States and Japan.
It has landing points in:
Shima, Mie Prefecture, Japan
Maruyama, Chiba Prefecture, Japan
Kitaibaraki, Ibaraki Prefecture, Japan
Mākaha, Oahu, Hawaii, United States
Point Arena, Manchester, Mendocino County, California, United States
Morro Bay, San Luis Obispo, San Luis Obispo County, California, United States

It has a design transmission capacity of 640 Gbit/s, starting operation at 80 Gbit/s and a total cable length of 21,000 km. It started operation in August 2001. It was upgraded to be capable of 1.28 Tbit/s operation in March 2008.

See also

References

 
 

Submarine communications cables in the Pacific Ocean
Mendocino County, California
Japan–United States relations
2001 establishments in California
2001 establishments in Hawaii
2001 establishments in Japan